Henry D. Obst (December 23, 1906 – August 27, 1975) was an American football guard who played two seasons in the National Football League with the Staten Island Stapletons and Philadelphia Eagles. He played college football at Syracuse University and attended Textile High School in New York, New York.

References

External links
Just Sports Stats

1906 births
1975 deaths
American football guards
Syracuse Orange football players
Staten Island Stapletons players
Philadelphia Eagles players
Sportspeople from Brooklyn
Players of American football from New York City